The BBC Jazz Awards were set up in 2001 and had the status of one of the premier jazz awards in the United Kingdom (among those presenting the awards were Denis Lawson, Sue Mingus, Humphrey Lyttelton, Ian Carr, Clive James, Mike Gibbs, Julian Joseph, Moira Stuart, Annie Whitehead, Mark Knopfler, Dave Brubeck, and Kenneth Clarke). There were awards for Best Musician, Best Vocalist, Rising Star, Best Album, Jazz Innovation, Radio 2 Jazz Artist, Services to Jazz, Best of Jazz and others.

Programmes linked to the awards were broadcast on both Radio 2 and Radio 3. In March 2009, the BBC announced that the Jazz Awards were closed.

Winners

2001
The winners were:
Best Band: Courtney Pine Band
Rising Star: Alex Wilson
Best Instrumental: Alan Barnes
Best Vocalist: Norma Winstone
Best Album: Jean Toussaint's Nazaire - Street Above The Underground
Best New Work: Chris Batchelor
Jazz Innovation: Iain Ballamy
Services to Jazz: Pete King (Ronnie Scott's)
International Award: Clark Terry
Lifetime Achievement: Humphrey Lyttelton

2002
The winners were:
Best Album: Brian Kellock Trio Live At Henry's 
Best Band: Jazz Jamaica All Stars 
Best Vocalist: Stacey Kent 
Best Instrumentalist: John Surman 
Rising Star: Soweto Kinch 
Best New Work: John Taylor, Green Man Suite 
Jazz Innovation: Matt Bourne 
Services to Jazz: Chris Hodgkins
International Award of the Year: Hugh Masekela 
Jazz Heritage Award: Chris Barber
Lifetime Achievement 1: Cleo Laine & John Dankworth 
Lifetime Achievement 2: Stan Tracey

2003
The winners were:
Best Band: Guy Barker's International Septet
International Artist: Esbjorn Svensson Trio
Lifetime Achievement: George Shearing
Best CD: Exile by Gilad Atzmon's Orient House Ensemble
Best Vocalist: Claire Martin
Rising Star: Jamie Cullum
Jazz Heritage Award: The Merseysippi Jazz Band
Best Instrumentalist: Brian Kellock
Best New Work: Interrupting Cutler by Brian Irvine
Jazz Innovation: Byron Wallen
Services to Jazz: Tony Dudley-Evans

2004
The winners were:
 Best Album: The Journey Home by Colin Steele
 Best Band: Soweto Kinch
 Best Vocalist: Ian Shaw
 Best Instrumentalist: Soweto Kinch
 Rising Star: Seb Rochford
 Best New Work: Cheltenham "Jerwood Rising Stars" Commission - Richard Fairhurst
 Jazz Innovation: F-IRE Collective
 Services to Jazz: Jed Williams
 International Award of the Year: Wynton Marsalis
 Jazz Heritage Award: Keith Nichols
 Lifetime Achievement: George Melly

2005
The winners were:
 Album of the Year: All Is Know by Tony Kofi
 Best Band: Acoustic Ladyland
 Best Vocalist: Liane Carroll
 Best Instrumentalist: Peter King
 Rising Star: Gwilym Simcock
 Artist of the Year: Jamie Cullum
 Services to Jazz: John Cumming
 Lifetime Achievement: Oscar Peterson
 Innovation Award: Huw Warren
 Best of Jazz: Liane Carroll
 Gold Award: Acker Bilk

2006
The winners were:
 Album of the Year: The Lyric by Jim Tomlinson
 Best of Jazz: Anita Wardell
 Radio 2 Jazz Artist of the Year: Jools Holland
 Radio 3 Jazz Line-Up award for Best Band: Dennis Rollins' Badbone and Co
 Radio 3 Jazz on 3 award for Innovation or Achievement in New Music: Tim Garland's Lighthouse Project
 Rising Star: Andrew McCormack
 Best Instrumentalist: Alan Barnes
 Best Vocalist: Clare Teal
 Services to Jazz in the UK: Ian Carr
 Lifetime Achievement: Quincy Jones

2007
The winners were:
 Album of the Year: Displaced by Neil Cowley Trio
 Best Band: Finn Peters' Finntet
 Best Vocalist: Ian Shaw
 Best Instrumentalist: Julian Siegel
 Rising Star: Simon Spillett
 Artist of the Year: Curtis Stigers
 International Artist: Madeleine Peyroux
 Services to Jazz: Gary Crosby
 Lifetime Achievement: Dave Brubeck
 Innovation Award: Tom Bancroft
 Heart of Jazz: Martin Taylor

2008
The winners were:
 Album of the Year: All is Yes by The Blessing
 Best Band: Tom Cawley's Curios
 Best Vocalist:Christine Tobin
 Best Instrumentalist: Tony Kofi
 Rising Star: Kit Downes
 Artist of the Year: Humphrey Lyttelton
 International Artist: Charlie Haden
 Services to Jazz: Alan Bates
 Lifetime Achievement: Return to Forever
 Innovation Award: Fraud
 Heart of Jazz: Tommy Smith
 Gold Award: Cleo Laine and John Dankworth

2011
The winners were:
 Album of the Year: Exile by Gilad Atzmon's Orient House Ensemble
 Best Band: Guy Barker's International Septet
 Best Vocalist: Claire Martin
 Best Instrumentalist: Brian Kellock
 Rising Star: Jamie Cullum
 International Artist: Esbjörn Svensson Trio
 Services to Jazz: Tony Dudley-Evans
 Lifetime Achievement: George Shearing
 Innovation Award: Byron Wallen
 Jazz Heritage: The Merseysippi Jazz Band
 Best New Work: Interrupting Cutler, Brian Irvine

References

External links
  (2008)

Jazz awards
Jazz Awards
Awards established in 2001
Lifetime achievement awards
2001 establishments in the United Kingdom
Jazz Awards
Jazz Awards